The 1928 California Golden Bears football team was an American football team that represented the University of California, Berkeley in the Pacific Coast Conference (PCC) during the 1928 college football season. In their third year under head coach Nibs Price, the team compiled a 6–2–2 record (3–0–2 against PCC opponents), finished in second place in the PCC, lost to Georgia Tech in the 1929 Rose Bowl, and outscored its opponents by a combined total of 141 to 36. The team was ranked No. 2 in the nation in the Dickinson System ratings released in December 1928.

The Rose Bowl game has become one of the most famous moments in Rose Bowl history. In the second quarter, California's defense forced a Georgia Tech fumble on their own 30-yard line, and the loose ball was scooped up by California center Roy Riegels. He began to run towards the Georgia Tech end zone for a score, but then, in trying to get around the Tech players, he inexplicably turned around and headed in the other direction. Riegels advanced all the way to the Golden Bears' one-yard line before teammate Benny Lom was able to stop him, whereupon he was immediately tackled by what seemed like the entire Georgia Tech team. California elected to punt on the next play; the punt was blocked for a safety, giving the Yellow Jackets a 2–0 lead and what turned out to be the decisive points.

Schedule

References

California
California Golden Bears football seasons
California Golden Bears football